Perfect Strangers may refer to:

Film 
 Perfect Strangers (1945 film), a film starring Robert Donat and Deborah Kerr
 Perfect Strangers (1950 film), a film starring Ginger Rogers
 Perfect Strangers (1984 film), a film starring Anne Carlisle and Brad Rijn
 Perfect Strangers (2003 film), a film starring Sam Neill
 Perfect Strangers (2004 film), a film starring Rob Lowe and Anna Friel
 Perfect Strangers (2016 film), a film starring Marco Giallini and Valerio Mastandrea
 Perfect Strangers (2017 film), a Spanish remake of the 2016 Italian film
 Perfect Strangers (2018 film), a Mexican remake of the 2016 Italian film
 Perfect Strangers (2022 film), a pan-Arab remake of the 2016 Italian film

Television 
 Perfect Strangers (TV series), a 1986–1993 American television sitcom
 Perfect Strangers (TV serial), a 2001 British television drama miniseries

Music 
 Perfect Strangers (album), a 1984 album by Deep Purple
 "Perfect Strangers" (Deep Purple song)
 "Perfect Strangers" (INXS song)
 "Perfect Strangers" (Anne Murray song)
 "Perfect Strangers" (Jonas Blue song)
 Perfect Strangers, an Australian band from in the 1980s.

Other uses 
 Invincible Vol. 3: Perfect Strangers, a trade paperback in the Invincible comic book series

See also
 Perfect Stranger (disambiguation)
 Absolute Strangers, a film about abortion